Hetaerina is a genus of damselflies in the family Calopterygidae. They are commonly known as Rubyspots because of the deep red wing bases of the males. The name is from Ancient Greek: ἑταίρα (hetaira), courtesan. H. rudis, the Guatemalan rubyspot, is considered vulnerable on the IUCN Red Data List.

The red wing-spots seen on males of most species of Hetaerina (H. titia being a notable exception) are considered to be the result of intrasexual selection.

Taxonomy
The genus contains the following species:

References

Calopterygidae
Zygoptera genera
Taxa named by Hermann August Hagen
Taxonomy articles created by Polbot